Horacio Gabriel Tijanovich (born 28 February 1996) is an Argentine professional footballer who plays as a forward for Platense.

Career
Tijanovich spent time in the youth of Atlético Uruguay and Don Bosco, prior to starting his senior career in 2012 with Torneo Argentino B team Defensores de Pronunciamiento. He featured thirteen times and scored four goals for DEPRO in 2012–13 as they were relegated to Torneo Argentino C. In February 2014, Tijanovich joined Argentine Primera División side Gimnasia y Esgrima. After being an unused substitute in a Copa Argentina match in July 2015, he made his professional debut in the league on 19 September against Tigre. One further appearance followed two months later versus Colón.

In July 2016, Tijanovich was loaned out to Agropecuario of Torneo Federal A. Eight goals in thirty-one appearances followed, including his first two goals against General Belgrano on 25 September in a season which ended with promotion. He returned to Gimnasia y Esgrima in June 2017, before almost immediately departing on loan again to join Primera División team Defensa y Justicia.

Career statistics
.

Honours
Agropecuario
 Torneo Federal A: 2016–17

References

External links

1996 births
Living people
People from La Matanza Partido
Argentine people of Ukrainian descent
Argentine people of Uruguayan descent
Sportspeople of Uruguayan descent
Argentine footballers
Association football forwards
Torneo Argentino B players
Torneo Argentino C players
Argentine Primera División players
Torneo Federal A players
Club de Gimnasia y Esgrima La Plata footballers
Club Agropecuario Argentino players
Defensa y Justicia footballers
Club Atlético Platense footballers
Sportspeople from Buenos Aires Province